The Associated Press (AP), Newspaper Enterprise Association (NEA), New York Daily News (NYDN), The Sporting News (SN), and United Press (UP) were among selectors of All-Pro teams comprising players adjudged to be the best at each position in the National Football League (NFL) during the 1955 NFL season. The AP, NEA, NYDN, and UP selected a first and second team. The UP also named "honorable mentions".

References

External links
 1955 NFL All-Pros – Pro-Football-Reference

All-Pro Teams
1955 National Football League season